Claude Barrabé (born 19 November 1966) is a retired French football goalkeeper.

References

1966 births
Living people
Footballers from Réunion
French footballers
Paris Saint-Germain F.C. players
Stade Brestois 29 players
Montpellier HSC players
Stade Malherbe Caen players
US Créteil-Lusitanos players
Association football goalkeepers
Ligue 1 players
Ligue 2 players
France under-21 international footballers
INF Vichy players